Amiral Xavier Magne is a French Navy officer, 
commander of European Maritime Force between 2011 and 2013.

Biography 
Magne made a career aboard the Charles De Gaulle. On the 5 August 2005, he was promoting from second officer to captain of the aircraft carrier, succeeding capitaine de vaisseau Denis Béraud.

As a squadron commander, he directed the naval component of Opération Baliste in 2006.

From 2007, he has served in the capacity of Chief of Staff for Maritime and Air Operations .

In 2011, he becomes ALFAN commanding the "Force d'action navale"

References

External links

  Xavier Magne at the French Defence Ministry site

French Navy admirals
Living people
Year of birth missing (living people)